The American Domestic Show Flight is a breed of fancy pigeon developed over many years of selective breeding. Domestic Show Flights, along with other varieties of domestic pigeons, are all descendants from the rock pigeon (Columba livia). The Domestic Show Flight is a relatively recent American creation which was developed in the state of New York.

See also
List of pigeon breeds

References

Pigeon breeds
Pigeon breeds originating in the United States